Leslie Joyce Hall Pinder (née Hall) (born 21 September 1948, died 12 June 2021) was a Canadian lawyer and writer.

Early life
Born in Elrose, Saskatchewan, she earned a B.A. in English literature from the University of Saskatchewan and Dalhousie University in 1968. Pinder then worked as a court recorder while pursuing legal studies, obtaining her LL.B. from the University of British Columbia in 1976.

Legal career
In 1978, Pinder commenced work for the Union of B.C. Indian Chiefs, as in-house counsel. In 1982, she formed her own firm, Mandell Pinder LLP, working almost exclusively for Indian people.

Literary career
In 1982, Lazara Press published her prose poem entitled "35 Stones" in broadside and postcard format.

Pinder's first novel, Under the House (1986) garnered superior reviews, and her second novel, On Double Tracks (1990), was short-listed for the 1990 Governor General's Award for English Fiction. Her third novel, "Bring Me One of Everything" (2012) has received excellent notices, including a starred review in Publishers Weekly. John Hulcoop in The Vancouver Sun referred to her as one of the "great magicians in literature".

After the publication of On Double Tracks, Pinder focused on her legal work, primarily on First Nations land claims in British Columbia; a few years ago, she turned to writing full-time. She lives part-time in urban Vancouver and on a remote island in British Columbia, and is currently finishing her third and fourth novels.

Pinder's first novel Under The House (1986) was re-created for the Vancouver stage for the Women in View Festival in 1990, a one-woman performance by Trish Grainge, directed by Jane Heyman. The novel focuses on the Rathbones, a prominent Saskatchewan family so determined not to look back at their past that they never see the chains binding them to it. The story unfolds primarily through the eyes of a niece, related by marriage rather than blood, and her aunt, both ostracized by the family patriarch, a misguided and controlling man intent on eliminating any 'outsiders' from sharing in the grandfather's estate. Pinder deals with the topic of incest delicately, and without setting up a stereotypical good-and-evil dichotomy, one of the many reasons the novel earned the respect of reviewers and colleagues, among them, the critic for The New York Times, who described Under the House as ". . . a brave work," and Margaret Atwood, who viewed Pinder as ". . . a writer of great talent and sensitivity . . ." Pinder's inspiration for the story was a rumour about a hidden relationship between two of her own family members. Illegitimacy is a recurring theme in her work and a stand-in for one's feelings of being an outsider.

The inspiration for Pinder's second novel On Double Tracks (1988, short-listed for the 1990 Canadian Governor General's Award for English Fiction) came, in part, from the treatment she received by the judge hearing one of her native land claims cases. In the novel, a young woman lawyer goes to court to reclaim land for a native Band, but from the outset of the trial, things go badly, and a disturbing level of confrontation builds. When the young lawyer and the aging judge journey back to their childhoods, it becomes clear that the courtroom drama merely brushes the surface of both wider and more personal dramas. Both characters head for psychological crises, but only one survives the wreckage.

In both novels, Pinder uses the courtroom as a forum of conflict and disclosure, a place where truth can be told, but not without revealing tragic flaws. Pinder's work explores the currency of secrets, particularly when two or more people conspire to keep them: the currency of intimacy, solidarity and allegiance, but in reality, secrets as the termites gnawing at the foundations of families and lives until their structures are destroyed.

Pinder's writing style has been compared to Faulkner in its depiction of the fictional unconscious, her prose both stark and subtle, intense and compassionate.

Novels
Under the House. Vancouver: Talon Books, 1986. Bloomsbury Publishing put out the first hardcover printing in the U.K. This was followed by an edition in the U.S., a translation into Finnish, softcover by Faber & Faber and finally another Random House Vintage edition in Canada. This novel has been revised and re-published by Shelfstealers, Inc. as an ebook and trade paperback (2012) with the audio book to be released in 2013.
On Double Tracks. Toronto: Lester & Orpen Dennys (Canada) and Bloomsbury Publishing (UK), 1990. Short-listed for the Canadian Governor General's Award for Fiction in 1990. In 1991 softcover rights were sold to Random House in Canada. To be re-published in e-book and audio book formats by Shelfstealers, LLC, in 2011.
Bring Me One of Everything. Grey Swan Press, 2012

Chapbook
The Carriers of No - Vancouver: Lazara Press, 1991.

Selected writings
Selected Writings of Leslie Hall Pinder, The Legal Studies Forum, Volume XXXI, Supp., 2007, College of Law, West Virginia University, ed. James R. Elkins. Includes selections from Pinder's writing, including the courtroom scenes from "On Double Tracks," a reprint of essays and a long verse poem, "The World is as Sharp as a Knife." The volume also contains an introduction by Elkins and excerpts from their correspondence.

References

External links
 Leslie Hall Pinder's Official Website
 Leslie Hall Pinder's Official Blog
Leslie Hall Pinder’s Obituary

1946 births
Living people
Lawyers in British Columbia
Canadian women novelists
Writers from Saskatchewan
Canadian legal writers
20th-century Canadian novelists
21st-century Canadian novelists
20th-century Canadian women writers
21st-century Canadian women writers
Canadian women non-fiction writers